Hyphantrophaga is a genus of flies in the family Tachinidae.

Species
H. angustata (Wulp, 1890)
H. blanda (Osten Sacken, 1887)
H. blandita (Coquillett, 1897)
H. collina (Reinhard, 1944)
H. euchaetiae (Sellers, 1943)
H. hyphantriae (Townsend, 1891)
H. scolex (Reinhard, 1953)
H. sellersi (Sabrosky, 1983)
H. virilis (Aldrich & Webber, 1924)

References

Exoristinae
Diptera of North America
Tachinidae genera
Taxa named by Charles Henry Tyler Townsend